RBT is an Australian factual television series that looks at the everyday workings of sobriety check points by Random Breath Testing (or RBT) police units, and is narrated by Australian actor Andrew Daddo.

The show began on the Nine Network on 27 June 2010 and follows RBT patrols in Australia testing for alcohol and drug-affected and reckless drivers. The premiere attracted 1.32 million viewers. The second season began in February 2011, followed by a third in September 2011. RBT entered its 12th season in November 2018. Seasons 1 through 11 were filmed in New South Wales, with production switching to South Australia in season 12. Starting in 2020, the show is filmed in Victoria.

International screenings 
The show is transmitted in the UK on Watch under the working title Booze Patrol Australia.

The show is also transmitted in South Africa on IGNITION TV

Season 1 (2010)

Season 2 (2011)

Season 3 (2011–2012)

Season 4 (2013)

Season 5 (2015)

Season 6 (2015)

Season 7 (2016)

Season 8 (2016)

Season 9 (2017)

Season 10 (2017)

Season 11 (2018)

Season 12 (2018–2019)

Season 13 (2019–2020)

Season 14 (2020)

Season 15 (2020)

Season 16 (2021)

Season 17 (2022)

Season 18 (2023)

Notes
 Except NSW & QLD.

References

Nine Network original programming
2010 Australian television series debuts
Australian factual television series
English-language television shows
Television series by Screentime